The 2013 Murray State Racers football team represented Murray State University in the 2013 NCAA Division I FCS football season. They were led by fourth-year head coach Chris Hatcher and played their home games at Roy Stewart Stadium. They were a member of the Ohio Valley Conference. They finished the season 6–6, 4–4 in OVC play to finish in a tie for fifth place.

Schedule

Source: Schedule

References

Murray State
Murray State Racers football seasons
Murray State Racers football